Henry Mitchell Jones VC, also known as Henry Michael Jones (11 February 1831 – 18 December 1916) was an Irish recipient of the Victoria Cross, the highest and most prestigious award for gallantry in the face of the enemy that can be awarded to British and Commonwealth forces. In later life he was a British diplomat.

Jones was born in Dublin. He entered the army as an ensign in 1849 and exchanged to the 7th Regiment of Foot (later the Royal Fusiliers) in 1854 during the Crimean War. As a lieutenant at the Battle of the Alma on 20 September 1854, whilst carrying the Queen's Colour he was severely wounded by gunshot through the lower jaw. He carried the bullet in his jaw for thirty years until he complained of a toothache. He saw a doctor who removed the bullet which had been lodged in his jawbone.

Jones was promoted to captain in 1855 and was awarded the VC "for having distinguished himself, while serving with the party which stormed and took the Quarries, before Sebastopol, by repeatedly leading on his men to repel the continual assaults of the enemy during the night. Although wounded early in the evening, Captain Jones remained unflinchingly at his post until after daylight the following morning." This took place on 7 June 1855, during the Siege of Sebastopol, but Jones' Victoria Cross was not gazetted (formally announced) until September 1857.

Jones resigned his commission three months prior to the notification of the award of his Victoria Cross, and entered the Diplomatic Service. He was appointed Consul in the Fiji and Tonga Islands 1863, Consul-General at Tabreez 1868, at Christiania 1875, and at Philippopolis (now Plovdiv) 1880. In 1889 he was appointed Minister Resident at Bangkok and in 1895 he was transferred to be Minister Resident and Consul-General at Lima and at Quito.

He retired from the Diplomatic Service in 1898 and died in Eastbourne, Sussex, on 18 December 1916.

The Medal
Jones' Victoria Cross is displayed at the Victoria Barracks in Sydney, New South Wales, Australia.

References

Listed in order of publication year
The Register of the Victoria Cross (1981, 1988 and 1997)

Ireland's VCs  (Dept of Economic Development, 1995)
Monuments to Courage (David Harvey, 1999)
Irish Winners of the Victoria Cross (Richard Doherty & David Truesdale, 2000)
JONES, Capt. Henry Michael, Who Was Who, A & C Black, 1920–2008; online edn, Oxford University Press, Dec 2007, accessed 11 Sept 2012

External links
Location of grave and VC medal (East Sussex)

1831 births
1916 deaths
19th-century Irish people
Irish officers in the British Army
People from Crumlin, Dublin
Royal Fusiliers officers
British Army personnel of the Crimean War
British Army recipients of the Victoria Cross
Irish recipients of the Victoria Cross
Crimean War recipients of the Victoria Cross
Chevaliers of the Légion d'honneur
Ambassadors of the United Kingdom to Thailand
Ambassadors of the United Kingdom to Peru
Ambassadors of the United Kingdom to Ecuador
Military personnel from Dublin (city)